XITE is an interactive music video platform. Founded in the Netherlands with linear networks, interactive TV, and on-demand streaming services, XITE is now live in the Netherlands, Belgium, Germany, the United States, Canada, the United Kingdom and Ireland. In the United States, it is available on the Amazon Fire TV, Apple TV and Roku streaming players as well as Comcast Xfinity and some Samsung TVs.

History 
XITE was founded by entrepreneur Derk Nijssen. The company invested in the channel by technology start-up fund Henq Innovation Fund 1, United Broadcast Facilities (UBF) and Rebel Technologies (a joint venture between UBF and XITE for interactive applications in video on demand). Base7 was used as the working name for the start of the Base7 transmitter. The home base was initially located in Rotterdam. [1]

The station started broadcasting in 2008 via the digital packages from UPC and Caiway. At UPC, XITE replaced the canceled music channel TMF Nederland. As with the canceled music channel The Box, viewers could request video clips by phone (0900 number or text message) by means of a clip code. In September 2009, XITE came up with an on-demand system via the red button on the remote control. Since then, the viewer has been able to request clips in this way and he has been able to compile playlists by genre and view specials and interviews.

In February 2011, XITE started broadcasting in Belgium via the basic package of Telenet. XITE started broadcasting in Germany in September 2014. [2] In 2016, the Personalized Music Television service was launched via Ooredoo in Qatar. In the same year, a 4K channel was offered via KPN, where music videos were shown in Ultra-HD. From May 2017, XITE 4K is also available in Canada.

Interactive music video TV app 
Since December 2015 XITE offers an interactive TV app for users of Ziggo (Netherlands) and Ooredoo (Qatar). Currently, the TV app is rolled out to 100 million households globablly.

Xite Music 

On 1 April 2019 Xite launched a digital music pay radio service on Ziggo in the Netherlands. It is a service that broadcast continuous streaming music and other forms of audio on multiple channel feeds. Xite Music replaced Stingray Music on Ziggo.

Linear channels 

Mini Disco
Teen Party
Piratenplaten (Dutch pop music)
In De Kroeg
POP NL
Schlagerfest (German Schlager)
XITE Hits 
Muziek Van Nu
Zeroes Heroes 
Back 2 The 90s 
80s Flashback
60s & 70s Fever
Gouwe Ouwe
Thuisorkest
Yoga Flow
Op De Koffie
Pure Focus
Mellow Beats
Take It Easy
Jazzy Dinner
LOVE.
Voel Je Goed
Sing-Along 
Huisfeestje
All Out Dance 
Workout! 
Reggae Feels 
Siempre Latino 
Country Roads 
Twist Again 
Rock Legends 
Rock On
Kneiterhard (Hardstyle)
Indie Wave 
Sit Back & Jazz
Soul Baby
Straattaal (Dutch hip hop)
Urban Vibes
Variable
Ziggo Dome

Logos

XITE Awards 
Since 2013, XITE has been organizing the XITE Awards every year. In addition to performances, awards are presented during the show for the best and most popular songs, artists, upcoming talent and an award for best music video of the year.

Programs 
XITE mainly programs music video clips, sometimes following a particular genre or theme. XITE also devotes attention to music-related topics, with interviews, club and festival reports.

Presenters 

 Iris Enthoven (2016 - now)
 Boris Lange (2014 - now)
 Ingrid Jansen (2014 - now)
 Femke van Leeuwen (2015-2016)
 Jorik Scholten (2014)
 Salma Chafouk Idrissi (2014)
 Sol Wortelboer (2013-2015)
 Sjaak P. van Es (2013)
 Gwen van Poorten (2012-2013)
 Celine Bernaerts (2011-2012)
 Alain Keeven (2011-2012)
 Sanne Bolten (2011)
 Lara Hoogstraten (2011)

References

Music television channels
Television channels in the Netherlands
Television channels in Flanders
Television channels in Belgium
Television stations in Germany
Television channels and stations established in 2008
Music organisations based in the Netherlands